Aso ebi (Yoruba), sometimes spelled as asoebi in Nigeria and ashobie in Sierra Leone and the Gambia, is a uniform dress or dressing code/style that is traditionally worn by Yorubas and acculturized by some other African cultures as an indicator of cooperation, camaraderie and solidarity during ceremonies, events and festive periods. The purpose of wearing the dress can be to serve as self-identification with age mates, relatives or friends during social occasions or funerals.

Origins
The word aso in Yoruba means cloth and ebi denotes family, so aso ebi can be described as a family cloth usually worn during funerals or family ceremonies. However, the practice has now spread beyond family dressing because strangers of a celebrant can wear the aso ebi.

Ayodele Olukoju, a Nigerian economic historian, believes aso ebi became a novelty in 1920 during a period of post-World War I economic boom triggered by the higher prices for products such as oil palm. However, William Bascom traced the origin to an earlier period when members of Yoruba age grades wore uniform dressing to mark fraternal bonds. In the 1950s, members of women's organizations or egbes turned out to ceremonies and anniversaries of relatives in the same style of dress, sandals, lappa, smock, or necklace; the culture signifies close friendship. The uniform dressing can also be a measure of personal affluence, because aso ebi involves rivalry between various egbes or groups with each group competing to outshine each other in terms of quality, originality and richness of the uniform.

Aso ebi in Nigerian society
From the mid-1960s to the late 1970s, imported lace and george were incorporated into Nigerian fabrics and they became popular items used for aso ebi. Increased demand for handcrafted traditional dresses such as agbada led to a resurgence of tailors and fashion designers specialized in making native attires. The tailors strived to meet the increasing demand and designs of uniform dressing, sometimes with the aid of the fashion pages of magazines to make style choices. The rise of aso ebi also coincided with an intense market of fashion and lifestyles magazines in Lagos; tailors look at designs for inspiration and their patrons buy the magazines to see whether they or their friends are pictured in them.

Aso ebi in recent times has become a city phenomenon that has spread to other West African cultures. Dealers of imported and local textile materials have benefited from the boom in demand for uniform dressing. Some textile dealers offer consultation services and bulk rates for the choice and cost of the dress and fabrics. While the price of fabrics in sewing the traditional attire is affordable, the aso ebi practice is still sometimes used as an identification with affluence. Some wear expensive embroidery and extra layers of cloth, whereas others, who cannot afford a whole outfit, add only matching tops and head coverings. Aso ebi has become an attire of class worn by celebrities and elites in recent times, especially Nigerian Nollywood stars. With fashion designers creatively making outfits for special occasions to meet the taste of their rich and wealthy customers, aso ebi outfits have become a regular occurrence today.

References

African clothing
Nigerian culture
Yoruba culture